Kimberly Kane (born August 28, 1983) is an American pornographic actress.

Biography
Kane was born in Tacoma, Washington, and moved to Los Angeles, California, in 2004 to pursue a career in adult entertainment. Kane officially entered the adult film industry a year before that, in August 2003, when she was 20 years old, and did her first scene for the film Troubled Teens.

In 2006, at the age of 23, she directed her first movie for Pulse Pictures entitled Naked & Famous, which received a 5-star review from AVN Magazine, the highest rating they give. Shortly after, Vivid Entertainment approached Kane to direct for Vivid-Alt, a branch dedicated to providing artists a platform to create high-end adult content with an alternative look to standard pornography.

After she made her directorial debut with Naked and Famous for Pulse Distribution, she went on to direct Triple Ecstasy, Morphine, and Live In My Secrets, three alt porn films produced by Vivid Entertainment.

Vivid-Alt ended up being where Kane cut her teeth in filmmaking, editing, and photography. Kane used mixed media in her movies, including Super 8mm film, giving her videos a unique aesthetic. During Kane's time at Vivid-Alt, she was also performing in a style of adult movie called "Parody", which recreated some of the world's most beloved films and television shows into mostly campy XXX feature productions. In 2009, Kane was cast to play Dana Scully in New Sensations' The Sex Files, winning Kane Best Actress across all adult industry platforms.

In 2012, Kane, along with some of her adult film colleagues, was featured in Maxim Magazine after doing a campaign with The Escapist. Kane also continued to pursue her love of photography. In 2012, her writing and photography were published twice in Vice Magazine, one of which being a portrait series entitled "Girls of Hollywood". During this time, Kane's photography was selected by Dian Hanson for Taschen's book The New Erotic Photographer Book Vol. 2. Kane also appeared as a cover-model for Taschen's Big Book of Pussy; notably Kane asked to be paid in art books for that modeling job.

In 2013, Kane returned as a lead actress in a new spin on the porn parody genre called "Super Hero". Kane played Wonder Woman in two Axel Braun features, one of them winning Kane Best Sex Scene at the XBIZ Awards. Notably the promotional photos of Kane in the Wonder Woman costume went viral on social and mainstream media. Kane later participated in a charity auction where the costume sold to fund the Free Speech Coalition.

In 2015, Kane signed on as host of Viceland/Munchies Sex+Food, a TV show that explores food fetishes, feeder/feedee, sploshing, food play, and food products related to sex. Also in 2015 Kane signed on with Penthouse Magazine to photograph their celebrity directed photoshoots, called "Pop-Shots".

Since coming on board with Penthouse, Kane has worked with Keith Hufnagel, skateboarder and owner of HUF WORLDWIDE clothing brand, Neek Lurk, creator of Anti Social Social Club, and comedian/actor Steve Agee.

Advocacy
On March 22, 2010, Kane participated in an anti-piracy public service announcement for the Free Speech Coalition. In the 2012 United States presidential election, Kane voiced her support for President Barack Obama, stating that she agreed with his views on women's issues, health care, and gay rights.

In 2013, Kane was approached by a group of fellow adult industry performers who were forming an advocacy group for adult performers. Kane, known for her strong opposition against Measure B 'The Condom Law,' was an obvious choice to be a founding member of the organization that would become APAC (Adult Performers Advocacy Committee).
Kane acted as Treasurer for APAC and co-wrote Porn 101, an informative video for anyone wanting to join the adult film industry. Porn 101 can be viewed on YouTube and is still relevant for anyone researching the adult industry.
APAC is now considered the voice of adult performers within the industry and in mainstream media. APAC represents performers in the gay, straight, trans, and queer branches of the adult film industry.

Awards
 2006 AVN Award – Best Group Sex Scene, Video – Squealer
 2006 AVN Award – Best Oral Sex Scene, Video – Squealer
 2006 NightMoves Award – Best New Director (Editor's Choice)
 2009 AVN Award – Best All-Girl 3-Way Sex Scene – Belladonna's Girl Train
 2010 AVN Award – Best Actress – The Sex Files: A Dark XXX Parody
 2010 XBIZ Award – Acting Performance of the Year, Female – The Sex Files: A Dark XXX Parody
 2010 XRCO Award – Single Performance, Actress – The Sex Files: A Dark XXX Comedy
 2011 AVN Award – Best Three-Way Sex Scene (G/G/B) – The Condemned
 2011 XRCO Award – Best Actress – The Sex Files 2: A Dark XXX Parody
 2011 Feminist Porn Award – Honourable Mention – My Own Master
 2016 AVN Hall of Fame
 2016 XBIZ Award – Best Sex Scene, Parody Release – Wonder Woman XXX: An Axel Braun Parody

References

Further reading

External links

 
 
 
 

1983 births
Actresses from Las Vegas
Actresses from Portland, Oregon
Actresses from Tacoma, Washington
Alt porn
American female erotic dancers
American pornographic film actresses
American pornographic film directors
Living people
Singers from Washington (state)
Pornographic film actors from Washington (state)
Tambourine players
Women pornographic film directors
Dancers from Washington (state)
21st-century American singers
21st-century American women singers
21st-century American drummers